"Boobs" is a fantasy short story by Suzy McKee Charnas. It was first published in Asimov's Science Fiction, in July 1989.

Synopsis

Kelsey Bornstein's classmates bully her because she is the first person their age to grow large breasts. However, instead of menstruating, Kelsey becomes a werewolf.

Reception

"Boobs" won the 1990 Hugo Award for Best Short Story and was a finalist for the 1989 Nebula Award for Best Short Story. Charnas has noted that Kelsey is "pretty selfish and empathy blind".

References

Werewolf fiction
Hugo Award for Best Short Story winning works
Works originally published in Asimov's Science Fiction
1989 short stories
Coming-of-age fiction